Eugene Wilder Chafin (November 1, 1852 – November 30, 1920) was an American politician and writer who served as the Prohibition Party's presidential candidate during the 1908 and 1912 presidential elections. He was active in local politics in Wisconsin, statewide elections in Wisconsin, Illinois, and Arizona, and campaigned throughout the United States and the world in favor of the prohibition of alcohol.

After serving as a delegate to multiple Prohibition national conventions he rose to serving on the national committee and then received the presidential nomination twice, but declined to seek the nomination again for the 1916 presidential election.

Early life

Eugene Wilder Chafin was born on November 1, 1852, to Samuel Evans Chafin and Betsy Almira Pollard on his family's farm in between East Troy and Mukwonago, Wisconsin. Chafin attended the University of Wisconsin–Madison and graduated on June 17, 1875, with a law degree and during his education shared a room with future Governor, Senator, and presidential candidate Robert M. La Follette. From 1875 to 1901 he practiced law in Waukesha, Wisconsin. On November 24, 1881, he married Carrie Arvila Hunkins and later had two children with her, one that died after birth on February 22, 1884 and Desdemona Eleanor on March 17, 1893.

On October 1, 1901, he moved to Chicago to become the superintendent of the city's Washingtonian home, which housed 1,500 alcoholics, and served in that position until 1904. From 1904 to 1908 he served as a lecturer as part of the Chautauqua movement. In 1909, he was admitted to practice law before the Supreme Court of the United States after being presented by Senator La Follette and with Carrie Nation in attendance.

Career

Local politics

In 1881, he left the Republican Party and joined the Prohibition Party and in the same year ran for District Attorney in Waukesha county. From 1884 to 1920, he served as a delegate to the Prohibition national conventions, from 1888 to 1896 he served as a national committeeman from Wisconsin and again for Arizona and California from 1912 to 1920, at the 1884 convention he served as the Sergeant-at-Arms and gave one of the seconding speechings for John St. John, and in 1900 he served on the platform committee.

In 1877, he was elected as the Justice of the Peace in Waukesha and served until 1883 and then served as Police Justice until 1885. He later served on the school and public library board. Chafin ran for the House of Representatives in Wisconsin in 1882 and in Illinois in 1902. In 1886 and 1900, he ran for attorney general in Wisconsin and later ran for attorney general in Illinois in 1904. In 1898, he ran for Governor of Wisconsin.

Presidential

1908

On July 16, 1908, Chafin was nominated by A. G. Wolfenbarger and Chafin won the Prohibition presidential nomination on the third ballot with 636 delegates voting for him against William B. Palmore, Daniel R. Sheen, Alfred L. Manierre, Will W. Tracy, Frederick F. Wheeler, James B. Cranfill, and Oliver W. Stewart. The vice presidential nomination was offered to Palmore due to him receiving the second highest amount of support, but he declined and the position was instead given to Aaron S. Watkins. While running for president he was also simultaneously running for the Prohibition gubernatorial nomination in Illinois, but was defeated in the primary by Daniel R. Sheen.

In August, he was swimming at the YMCA in Lincoln, Nebraska, where he almost drowned, but was rescued by three people. On August 14, 1908, he was giving a speech in Springfield, Illinois, when a lynch mob started a race riot in an attempt to kill three black prisoners and while he was taking his handkerchief out from his pocket a member of the mob believed that he was pulling a gun out and threw a brick at him. In the general election he received 254,087 votes for 1.71% of the total popular vote.

1912

Chafin started his second presidential campaign on January 5, 1912, in Tucson, Arizona, and then traveled east towards Atlantic City, New Jersey, where on July 12, 1912, he won the Prohibition presidential nomination on the first ballot with 594 delegates after having his name presented by F. J. Sibley and Watkins was selected as his vice president again after two ballots. After winning the nomination he traveled towards the western United States and campaigned in all of the states along the Pacific Coast before the general election. During the campaign he traveled a total of 36,300 miles through thirty states and received 208,156 votes for 1.38% of the popular vote in the general election.

1916

In December 1915, he stated that he would not seek the Prohibition presidential nomination again for the 1916 presidential election and that he believed that Representative Richmond P. Hobson would receive the nomination. He also gave his support to Henry Ford's Peace Ship and that he would put forward a vote to add abolishing the War and Navy Departments and establishing a Department of Peace at the 1916 National Prohibition Convention.

Chafin attempted to draft Henry Ford for the Prohibition presidential nomination, but he made no attempt. At the national convention he put forward former New York Governor William Sulzer for the presidential nomination, but he was defeated by former Indiana Governor Frank Hanly with 440 delegates to 188 delegates on July 21, 1916. An attempt was made to make Hanly's nomination unanimous, but it failed after Chafin objected. He also objected and stopped efforts to rename the party to either the Progressive, American, or National party and criticized Virgil G. Hinshaw for writing to John M. Parker in an attempt to fuse the Prohibition and Progressive parties. In the general election, Hanly and Ira Landrith received 221,302 votes for 1.19% of the popular vote.

Later life

In 1908, Chafin was appointed to the bar of the Supreme Court of the United States and in October 1909, he and his family moved to Tucson in the Arizona Territory. Following Arizona's admission into the United States as a state he ran in the House special election and received 0.41% in fourth place.

In January 1913, he started a campaign in Milwaukee, Wisconsin, to fundraise $1,000,000 for the Prohibition party to use during the 1916 elections and later participated in a fundraising event in November across Ohio to raise $10,000 for the party.

On January 29, 1914, he announced that he would run in Arizona's Senate election and received 15.05% in the general election and from 1914 to 1915 gave lectures as part of the Flying Squadron of America. Chafin also campaigned in favor of a California ballot proposition to prohibit alcohol in 1914 and during it stated that women who voted against it deserved to be beaten by their husbands.

On January 6, 1919, Chafin and his family boarded the S.S. Sonoma to travel to Australia to help the Australian prohibition movement. The Eighteenth Amendment banning alcohol was ratified while he was traveling on January 16, 1919, and he was interviewed after disembarking in Australia.

On November 20, 1920, Chafin was lighting his gas heater at his home in Long Beach, California, in the Los Angeles area, and his clothing caught fire. He suffered burns and was initially saved by Henry Murray who wrapped him in quilts, but he died from his injuries on November 30. In 1921, his cremated remains were buried in Prairie Home Cemetery in Waukesha, Wisconsin, and the National Prohibition Committee had a memorial hour for Chafin at its November 1921 session.

Electoral history

Bibliography
Voters' Handbook, (1876)
Lives of the Presidents, (1896)
Lincoln, the Man of Sorrow, (1908)
Washington as a Statesman, (1909)
The Master Method of the Great Reform, (1913)

References

External links

1852 births
1920 deaths
20th-century American politicians
Accidental deaths in California
Arizona Prohibitionists
Candidates in the 1908 United States presidential election
Candidates in the 1912 United States presidential election
Deaths from fire in the United States
Illinois Prohibitionists
People from East Troy, Wisconsin
Politicians from Waukesha, Wisconsin
Prohibition Party (United States) presidential nominees
School board members in Wisconsin
University of Wisconsin–Madison alumni
Wisconsin lawyers
Wisconsin Prohibitionists
Writers from Wisconsin
19th-century American lawyers